Jacob Duffy (born 2 August 1994) is a New Zealand cricketer who plays for Otago. Duffy made his senior debut in an HRV Cup match against Northern Districts in January 2012. He made his international debut for the New Zealand cricket team in December 2020.

Duffy was born at Lumsden in the Southland Region and was educated at Southland Boys' High School in Invercargill.

Career
Duffy was the joint-leading wicket-taker in the 2017–18 Plunket Shield season for Otago, with 29 dismissals in eight matches. In June 2018, he was awarded a contract with Otago for the 2018–19 season. He was the leading wicket-taker for Otago in the 2018–19 Ford Trophy, with 25 dismissals in eleven matches. He was the joint-leading wicket-taker for Otago in the 2018–19 Super Smash, with thirteen dismissals in nine matches.

In June 2020, Duffy was offered a contract by Otago ahead of the 2020–21 domestic cricket season.

In November 2020, Duffy was named in the New Zealand A cricket team for practice matches against the touring West Indies team. The following month, he was named in New Zealand's Twenty20 International (T20I) squad for their series against Pakistan. He made his T20I debut for New Zealand on 18 December 2020, against Pakistan. He took 4 wickets for 33 from his four overs, and was named the player of the match.

In April 2021, Duffy was named in New Zealand's Test squad for their series against England, and for the final of the 2019–21 ICC World Test Championship. In May 2022, Duffy was again named in New Zealand's Test squad for their tour of England.

On 2 June 2022, Duffy signed a short-term deal to play as an overseas player for Kent County Cricket Club in two County Championship matches. He took eight wickets, with a five-wicket haul which included three wickets in an over, in his debut for the county.

In June 2022, Duffy was named in New Zealand's One Day International (ODI) squad for their tour of Ireland. He made his ODI debut on 12 July 2022, for New Zealand against Ireland.

References

External links
 

1994 births
Living people
People from Lumsden, New Zealand
New Zealand cricketers
New Zealand One Day International cricketers
New Zealand Twenty20 International cricketers
Otago cricketers
People educated at Southland Boys' High School
South Island cricketers